The Hong Kong Senior Shield 2007–08, also known as the 2007–08 HKFA Choi Fung Hong Senior Shield, is the 106th staging of the Hong Kong's oldest football knockout competition.

The competition started on 22 November 2007 with 10 Hong Kong First Division clubs and concluded on 23 December 2007 with the final.

Eastern captured their 7th title of the competition after beating Kitchee by 3-1 in the final. They qualified for the 2009 AFC Cup.

Teams
Bulova Rangers
Citizen
Convoy Sun Hei
Eastern
Happy Valley
Kitchee
Lanwa Redbull
South China
Wofoo Tai Po
Workable

Fixtures and results
All times are Hong Kong Time (UTC+8).

Bracket

First round

Quarter-finals

Semi-finals

Final

Scorers
 6 goals
  Rodrigo (Eastern)

 3 goals
  Detinho (South China)

 2 goals
  Sham Kwok Keung (Happy Valley)
  Goran Stankovski (Kitchee)
  Lo Kwan Yee (Kitchee)

 1 goal
  Godfred Karikari (Bulova Rangers)
  Siumar (Bulova Rangers)
  Chen Zhizhao (Citizen)
  Fabio (Eastern)
  Denisson (Happy Valley)
  Fagner (Happy Valley)
  Tomy (Happy Valley)
  Chan Siu Ki (Kitchee)
  Julius Akosah (Kitchee)
  Li Yao (Kitchee)
  Wilfed Bamnjo (Kitchee)
  Kwok Kin Pong (South China)
  Yip Chi Ho (South China)
  Lee Wai Lim (Wofoo Tai Po)

Prizes

Teamwise
 Champion (HKD$80,000): Eastern
 1st-Runner-up (HKD$20,000): Kitchee
 Knock-out in the Semi-Finals (HKD$10,000 each): Happy Valley, South China
 Knock-out in the Preliminary (HKD$5,000 each): Bulova Rangers, Citizen, Convoy Sun Hei, Lanwa Redbull, Wofoo Tai Po, Workable

Individual
 Top Scorer Award (HKD$5,000): Rodrigo Andreis Galvao (Eastern)
 Best Defender Award (HKD$5,000): Luciano (Eastern)

Trivia
 Eastern head coach Casemiro Mior captured the Hong Kong Senior Shield for the 5th time. For the last four times, he led another First Division League team South China, including for the last season in 2006-07.
 Originally, Eastern should have regulated to the Third 'A' Division League for the 2007-08 season, and therefore unqualified for competing in  Senior Shield. However, the team was invited to enter the First Division and was able to compete in Senior Shield. This was similar to the case happened in the previous season for the champion team South China, as South China should have regulated to the Second Division League and unqualified for Senior Shield.

See also
Hong Kong Senior Shield
The Hong Kong Football Association
Hong Kong FA Cup 2007-08
Hong Kong First Division League 2007-08
Hong Kong League Cup 2007-08

References

External links
 Fixtures at HKFA.com

Shield, 2007-08
Hong Kong Senior Shield
Hong Kong Senior Challenge Shield, 2007-08